Branko Ivanković (born 28 February 1954) is a Croatian former footballer who played as a midfielder, and the current head coach of the Oman national team. After a 12-year playing career at Varteks, Ivanković started his coaching career at the same club in 1991. He led the Iran national team at the 2006 FIFA World Cup.

Playing career
Ivanković spent his entire 12-season playing career at Varteks, appearing in a total of 263 matches and scoring 31 goals. He then continued to work at the club by first being their secretary and then starting his coaching career.

Managerial career
He was the head coach of Varteks between 1991 and 1995. He then moved for one season to Segesta Sisak and went on to coach Rijeka in the 1996–97 season.

Croatia national team
Ivanković then became an assistant manager to Miroslav Blažević, who led the Croatia national team to a sensational third-place finish at the 1998 World Cup finals in France.

In the 1999–2000 season, he coached German club Hannover 96, which was playing in the 2. Bundesliga at the time. He briefly returned to the Croatia national team as the assistant to Mirko Jozić during the qualifications for the 2002 World Cup, before he took over the Iran national team, where he replaced Blažević, who had managed them since 2001.

Iran national team
Ivanković was appointed to the head of the Iranian team on 29 January 2002. Under Ivanković, Iran's U23 football team won the 2002 Asian Games in Pusan. He remained the coach of the national team until the end of 2002, when he was replaced by Homayun Shahrokhi.

Ivanković had become very popular in Iran and the public media demanded a contract renewal, but the Football Federation was initially reluctant to appoint him as the head coach. Finally after a period of negotiations he was reappointed as the head coach of Iran on 3 October 2003.

Ivanković led Iran to 2004 AFC Asian Cup third place. 

Ivanković also led Iran to qualify for the 2006 World Cup, the third time in the country's history (they had previously been eliminated in the first round in 1978 and 1998).

Despite him being the most successful coach of the Iran national team in terms of winning percentage, Ivanković was not liked by the Iranian government who deliberately tried to replace him with a native coach. The Organization for Physical Education which is a governmental watchdog on sports, tried to replace the coach before the World Cup in Germany, however the Iranian Football Federation resisted the pressure and kept Ivanković for the 2006 World Cup.

2006 World Cup
Iran, at their opening game at the World Cup, showed a scintillating first half performance against Mexico, but conceded two goals. The second match against Portugal was not successful either, with Iran conceding two late goals to lose 2–0 and being left without any chances of advancing to the second stage of the tournament, as Mexico drew against Angola on the previous evening and left Iran unreachable four points behind. So, the third group match against Angola became insignificant for Iran. Angola put themselves into the lead with the opening goal after one hour of playing. The Iranians managed to equalise fifteen minutes later, eventually scoring their only point at the 2006 World Cup since the match ended in a 1–1 draw. This point was, however, only enough for Iran to occupy the last place in their group.

After the World Cup, MPE removed the Head of the Football Federation of Iran, replacing Ivanković with Amir Qalenoei. This in turn resulted a FIFA suspension for Iran's football due to political interference.

Dinamo Zagreb
On 6 November 2006, Ivanković replaced Josip Kuže as the head coach of Croatian club Dinamo Zagreb. He led the club to the Double in 2007 without losing a single competitive match. On 14 January 2008, he resigned as the coach of Dinamo Zagreb, mostly due to his differences with the club's executive vice-president Zdravko Mamić.

Ivanković returned as the manager of Dinamo Zagreb on 21 May 2008. He replaced Zvonimir Soldo, who resigned immediately after Dinamo won the domestic double.

In July 2009, Ivanković was offered the role of Persepolis manager in Iran, but he rejected the offer.

Shandong Luneng
On 17 December 2009, Ivanković was appointed as the new head coach of Chinese giant Shandong Luneng. In his first season, he led the team to the 2010 Chinese Super League winners with a record 63 points. The team secured the qualification for 2011 AFC Champions League, but Shandong were eliminated in the first round with 7 points. Due to poor result in the Champions League, he was dismissed on 10 May 2011, seven days before crucial game with Cerezo Osaka, which they lost by a score of 0–4.

Ettifaq
On 22 July 2011, Ivanković signed a one-year contract with Ettifaq to lead the club in the 2011–12 Saudi Professional League and return club to the AFC Champions League. He was sacked on 29 April 2012 after finishing the 2011–12 season in fourth.

Al Wahda
In May 2012, UAE Pro-League side Al-Wahda said it signed a two-year contract with Ivanković and that he would take charge at the club in the 2012–13 season, but his contract was terminated on 27 April 2013, after a 3–4 loss to Ajman Club. At the time of his dismissal, Al Wahda was ranked at the 7th place.

Return to Dinamo Zagreb
On 2 September 2013, Ivanković returned to Dinamo Zagreb, the club he led from 2006 to 2008. However, he was sacked on 21 October 2013, after just five games.

Persepolis

On 5 April 2015, Ivanković was confirmed as the new manager of Persepolis, signing a -year contract with the club. After good performances with the club, which left the team in the first place with six matches remaining, Ivanković extended his contract with Persepolis in April 2016 to the end of the 2017–18 season and in 2017 to the end of the 2019–20 season. After the end of the 2018–19 season, it was reported that he was signed for Ahli Jeddah before returning to Croatia for his annual vacation. Ivanković announced that he will leave Persepolis on 11 June 2019.

Al-Ahli
On 18 June 2019, he was confirmed signing a two-year contract with Al-Ahli. On 16 September 2019, Ivanković was officially sacked after just five games due to poor results.

Oman national team
On 19 January 2020, Ivanković was announced as the head coach of the Oman national team to succeed Erwin Koeman after the latter's dismissal. Under Ivanković, Oman pulled off a historic win over Japan in the final round of the 2022 FIFA World Cup. In December 2021, he extended his contract with Oman until 2023.

Personal life
Branko is the younger brother of Zlatko Ivanković, who has also coached various teams in the Middle East.

Managerial statistics

Honours

Assistant coach
Croatia
FIFA World Cup third-place: 1998

Manager
Iran U23
Asian Games Gold Medal: 2002

Iran
AFC Asian Cup third place: 2004
WAFF Championship: 2004
AFC/OFC Cup Challenge: 2003

Dinamo Zagreb
Croatian First League: 2006–07, 2007–08
Croatian Cup: 2006–07
Croatian Super Cup: 2006

Shandong Luneng
Chinese Super League: 2010

Persepolis
Persian Gulf Pro League: 2016–17, 2017–18, 2018–19, runner-up: 2015–16
Hazfi Cup: 2018–19
Iranian Super Cup: 2017, 2018, 2019
AFC Champions League runner-up: 2018

Individual
HNS Croatian Coach of the Year: 2007, 2008
Chinese Football Association Coach of the Year: 2010
Persian Gulf Pro League Coach of the Season: 2016–17, 2017–18, 2018–19

References

External links

1954 births
Living people
Sportspeople from Čakovec
Association football midfielders
Yugoslav footballers
NK Varaždin players
Croatian football managers
NK Varaždin managers
HNK Segesta managers
HNK Rijeka managers
Hannover 96 managers
Iran national football team managers
GNK Dinamo Zagreb managers
Shandong Taishan F.C. managers
Ettifaq FC managers
Al Wahda FC managers
Persepolis F.C. managers
Al-Ahli Saudi FC managers
Oman national football team managers
2004 AFC Asian Cup managers
2006 FIFA World Cup managers
Saudi Professional League managers
Chinese Super League managers
Persian Gulf Pro League managers
Croatian expatriate football managers
Expatriate football managers in Germany
Croatian expatriate sportspeople in Germany
Expatriate football managers in Iran
Croatian expatriate sportspeople in Iran
Expatriate football managers in China
Croatian expatriate sportspeople in China
Expatriate football managers in Saudi Arabia
Croatian expatriate sportspeople in Saudi Arabia
Expatriate football managers in the United Arab Emirates
Croatian expatriate sportspeople in the United Arab Emirates
Expatriate football managers in Oman
Croatian expatriate sportspeople in Oman